Richard G. Fecteau (born 1927) of Lynn, Massachusetts is a Central Intelligence Agency operative who was captured by operatives of the People's Republic of China during a CIA-sponsored flight over mainland China during the Korean War. News of the capture of Fecteau and John T. Downey reached the United States in November 1954, sparking a nearly two decade battle of wills between the U.S. and the PRC. Fecteau was released in December 1971. He later worked as an assistant athletic director at his alma mater, Boston University, retiring in 1989.

CIA career
He joined the Central Intelligence Agency (CIA) soon after Boston University and became one of two CIA Paramilitary Officers in Special Activities Division (the other was John Downey, a Yale graduate) who survived the shoot-down of their mission over the People's Republic of China in November 1952. Both were captured and spent approximately the next two decades in Chinese prisons before release.

Due to improving U.S.-China relations, Fecteau and Mary Ann Harbert, who was captured on a yacht in Chinese waters near Hong Kong in April 1968, were released on 13 December 1971, crossing the land border into Hong Kong where they were received by U.S. consular officials. Harbert and Fecteau were flown by helicopter to Kai Tak Airport and then boarded a United States Air Force aeromedical evacuation jet and flown to Clark Air Base, Hawaii and then on to McGuire Air Force Base.

Harbert and Fecteau were taken to Valley Forge Military Hospital for medical evaluation. Fecteau was reported to be having difficulty adjusting to his release, being uncommunicative after having spent most of the preceding 19 years in solitary confinement.

Throughout his captivity the U.S. had denied that he was a CIA agent. On hearing news of his release, his ex-wife Margaret (who had divorced him in 1951) stated that "the Chinese haven't been lying" about him being a CIA agent, but she recanted the statement the next day. However U.S. officials disclosed privately that they no longer denied the Chinese charges that he was a spy. In a press conference on 15 December he said that he had never given up hope of release, but had got so used to solitary confinement that he was unused to speaking, when asked if he was a CIA agent he replied "no comment."

In an official statement made by Xinhua News Agency at the time of his release, the Chinese government said that Fecteau was a CIA spy but that given that he had admitted his crimes during trial and his behavior was not bad in accordance with the proletarian policy of leniency he was being released prior to the end of his 20 year sentence. 

In 2013, the CIA awarded Fecteau the Distinguished Intelligence Cross. The CIA's Studies in Intelligence, vol. 50, no. 4, 2006 included an article describing the mission, the capture, and, ultimately, the release of agents Downey and Fecteau. A related video documentary was placed on the CIA website.

References

External links 
 Two CIA Prisoners in China, 1952–73

1927 births
Living people
American people convicted of spying for the United States
American people imprisoned abroad
Boston University Terriers football players
People from Lynn, Massachusetts
People of the Central Intelligence Agency
Prisoners and detainees of the People's Republic of China
Recipients of the Intelligence Medal of Merit